Student Prince may refer to:

Adcox Student Prince, a biplane built in Portland, Oregon in 1929
The Student Prince, an operetta by Sigmund Romberg and Dorothy Donnelly
The Student Prince (film), a 1954 MGM film 
The Student Prince (restaurant), a German restaurant in Springfield, Massachusetts
The Student Prince, a 1997 TV movie starring Robson Green
Student Prince, a defunct club on the Jersey Shore
The Student Princes, the athletic mascot of Heidelberg University in Ohio

See also
The Student Prince in Old Heidelberg, a 1927 silent film